Tyris Flare  (ティリス=フレア Tirisu Furea), written as Tyris=Flare in her early appearances, is one of the main protagonists of Sega's video game franchise Golden Axe and the sole playable character in Golden Axe: Beast Rider. Tyris was introduced as a princess-turned-amazon in the original beat 'em up game Golden Axe in 1989, and was controversially rebooted as a religious warrior in the 2008 action-adventure reboot Beast Rider. In both of her incarnations, she is fighting against evil forces in a heroic fantasy setting and in particular seeking have her revenge on the power-hungry warlord Death Adder. Tyris has been one of the most popular early heroes of the beat 'em up and hack and slash genres. She is known as one of the iconic female characters of the 16-bit era.

Appearances

In the Golden Axe games
In the early Golden Axe beat 'em up games, Tyris Flare is a former princess of the Firewood Kingdom, where she lived happily with her parents, the king and the queen. One fateful day, on her 17th birthday (fourth in the PC Engine version), an evil army led by the giant Death Adder invaded her kingdom. Her father and the kingdom's army tried to fight them off, only to be defeated. After her father was slain by Death Adder, her mother escaped with her to the canyons. After momentarily evading Death Adder's army, her mother told her to remain hidden deep within the canyons no matter what happens just moments before one of Death Adder's minion suddenly appeared and killed her. Tyris was then adopted by the amazons who trained her in the arts of swordsmanship and fire magic. 

In the computer versions of the first game, her story was altered. There, Tyris is said to be an amazon warrior queen and the last surviving member of her jungle tribe. She has nothing more to live for - her people were all put to the sword by Death Adder's evil minions and the jungle was razed to the ground. She has sworn by all that is sacred to her people that she will avenge their deaths by defeating Death Adder and liberating the land of Yuria.

The first Golden Axe (1989) begins with the 23-year-old Tyris and her friends Ax Battler and Gilius Thunderhead find their mortally wound friend Alex, who tells them that the king and the princess have been taken by Death Adder and asks to avenge him before passing away. Tyris fights her way through the land of Yuria to the castle of Death Adder. Even though he is wielding the legendary Golden Axe, Tyris is victorious and saves the king and his daughter. A few years after Death Adder's defeat, Dark Guld claims the power of the Golden Axe conquer the land in Golden Axe II (1991) and the three warriors go into battle again to deal with this new menace. She makes a cameo appearance in the action-adventure game Golden Axe Warrior. One of playable characters in the fighting game spin-off Golden Axe: The Duel is also Tyris' relative named Milan Flare.

A different Tyris Flare is the protagonist of the 2008 reboot game Golden Axe: Beast Rider, in which she is a "half-gladiator/half-barbarian" defender of the Axirian Priestesses, a female sect worshipping the Great Dragon in the Island of Axir. After the sisterhood is wiped out by Death Adder's forces, she takes up sword and sorcery to avenge them and stop him from taking over the world. The game ends with her killing Death Adder in a snake form.

Gameplay and design 

In Golden Axe and Golden Axe II, the Tyris has the shortest melee attack range among the heroes, but is most agile and has the most powerful spells; her magic attacks are all fire-based, including the summoning of a giant, flame-spewing dragon. In Golden Axe II, she has a new outfit. She is blonde in the first game but her hair color changes through the series.

According to Beast Rider developer Secret Level, the focus was on reimagining her in the reboot. In their game, she has darker skin, shorter red hair, and white warpaint around her green eyes, uses various swords, and wears several different, mostly tribal-like outfits (and her original costume) that can be unlocked by the player. The game's producer Nigel Cook said: "We gathered many opinions from internal Sega employees and from actual Golden Axe fans. To be honest it was pretty much a split decision between Tyris Flare and Gilius Thunderhead. What pushed us over the edge in choosing Tyris was her unique combat style—a mixture of half gladiator, half barbarian along with her motivation for revenge against Death Adder. She is also very pleasing on the eye!"

Other appearances
In the early-1990s Golden Axe II sequel comic serialized in Sonic the Comic, the blonde Tyris is the leader of the trio (depicted on the issue #5 cover). In the story "Citadel of Dead Souls", she gets captured by the dark sorcerer Blackspell and his female apprentice Ul-Tima to be sacrificed for the resurrection of Dark Guld, but escapes and leads her friends to destroy the villains and secure the Golden Axe. While taking it back to Yuria in "Plague of Serpents", they are attacked by Cobraxis and his wizard priests, but manage to defeat them too. In 2015, Tyris was featured in the crossover comic series Worlds Unite. After her world is invaded, she destroys the witch Berkana (from Mega Man) with her fire magic; afterwards, she joins heroes from other worlds to stop the villain Sigma (too from Mega Man).

A figurine of Tyris was released by Yujin as part of the SR Sega Girls Collection 2 and a T-shirt print of her was also produced. Easy Mode in the 1996 beat' em up game Dynamite Deka changes the player character Cindy Holiday into Tyris and allows her to fight Death Adder replacing one of the game's bosses. She also makes a cameo appearance in the arcade version of the 1990 beat'em up Alien Storm.

Reception

Early games
Despite being introduced after some other 'bikini-clad warrior' type player characters like Princess Mariana from Barbarian II: The Dungeon of Drax (portrayed in advertisements by Maria Whittaker; ST Format later compared Tyris Flare to Whittaker), it was Tyris Flare who has been the first to achieve high popularity. Many video game publications noted Tyris for her sex appeal, in particular for her large bust. Brazilian magazine Ação Games placed her 14th on their list of "Top Girls" in 1997. Reviewing the first Golden Axe in 2010, GamesRadar's Justin Towell wrote "Tyris Flare is still hot, in a 1980s Barabarian chick kind of way." According to Retro Gamer, "This sexy Amazonian fighter is a firm favourite with players due to her excellent fire magic and extremely flimsy clothing." Retro Gamer included Tyris among the nine memorable "leading ladies" of video games and also commented of "thinking back to when we first saw that enormous dragon head hove into view and roast the occupants of the arcade cabinet to charcoal while Tyris strutted her stuff in a medieval bikini. That was something you didn't see every day back then." According to ABC's Good Game retrospective about early female video game characters, while in early games Tyris "forgot to put her armour on over her underwear. These days, she's much more properly attired for combat." GamesRadar's Jim Sterling included "this flame-haired temptress [who] seems to think that doing battle in a bikini is a wise idea" on his 2011 list of the sexiest sprites of all time, adding: "She has 16 bits of world class tits and nobody's taking that away from her."

Beast Rider
The character's reimagined version in Golden Axe: Beast Rider received a very mixed critical reception. GamesRadar criticized the game for removing the other heroes "leaving only a super-slutted-up version of Tyris Flare," but added: Again, we're sort of fine with that it's a chance to re-invent the series for a new age, maybe even position it as competition against God of War or Heavenly Sword. Instead, all the attention went to Tyris and her barely covered man magnets." IGN's Juan Castro questioned how "the hot" Tyris is wearing "a bikini-type outfit" for "riding bore creatures while fighting to the death. But hey, she certainly looked good." GameSpot's Chris Watters opined Tyris in the game "wears an outfit is every bit as fantastical and clichéd as the adventure she embarks on." WP.pl review of Beast Rider noted a possibility of donning a "skimpy bikini that would be envied by many in adult film actress." GameTrailers review twice stressed the "sassy" Tyris is "likeable" even as her battle cries can get "especially annoying." According to GamesRadar US, however, "Tyris herself is phenomenally unappealing," as "despite her nicely rendered model, she animates like a dysfunctional paper puppet, promptly subtracting any sex appeal she might have had from the equation." Eurogamer's Dan Whitehead lambasted Tyris' animation in the game as "hilariously bad, her movements stiff and laughably doll," comparing her run to the scene in The Muppet Movie "when they'd cut away to Kermit's legs being moved around on sticks to show him moving." Play'''s Dave Halverson wrote: "Tyris is a beautiful heroine; so beautiful, in fact, that the absence of dynamic animation is all the more puzzling," singling out her "limited boob animation" as his special concern. Conversely, Destructoid's Conrad Zimmerman compared Tyris to a drug addict prostitute and not because of costume as "after all and it's not an unexpected wardrobe choice for women in these sorts of games. It's just that her face and hair look really awful."

Legacy
Kristan Reed of Eurogamer included the "three big, bold, diverse characters," including Tyris, among the reason for why Golden Axe had a "huge" impact on gaming in 1989. A "squat, cartoon version of Tyris Flare" is featured as Golden Axe homage in Mooff Games' Maximus. According to USgamer's Jeremy Parish article about the controversy surrounding Dragon's Crown in the West, the game's "Amazon's red-trimmed chain mail serves as a dual homage to Red Sonja and Tyris Flare." GamesRadar's David Houghton opined Tyris should have made a guest appearance in The Elder Scrolls V: Skyrim despite the region's cold climate as it is "no stranger to heroes in ridiculously inappropriate clothing." The freeware fanmade prequel game Golden Axe Myth features Tyris as a playable character, and an unofficial mod adds her as a recruitable player character in the role-playing video game Baldur's Gate II. In 2014, Retro Gamer were close to choosing her as one of the classic "ingredients needed to make the ultimate scrolling fighter" for the category "Player 2 character", ultimately choosing Blaze Fielding from Sega's own Streets of Rage''.

References

Adoptee characters in video games
Beat 'em up characters
Fantasy video game characters
Female characters in video games
Fictional swordfighters in video games
Orphan characters in video games
Princess characters in video games
Sega protagonists
Queen characters in video games
Video game characters introduced in 1989
Video game characters who use magic
Video game characters with fire or heat abilities
Woman soldier and warrior characters in video games
Golden Axe